Vavis was a Greek shooter.  He competed at the 1896 Summer Olympics in Athens. Vavis competed in the military pistol event.  His place and score in the competition are unknown except that he did not finish in the top five.

References

External links

Year of birth missing
Year of death missing
Greek male sport shooters
Olympic shooters of Greece
Shooters at the 1896 Summer Olympics
19th-century sportsmen
Place of birth missing
Place of death missing